Pannaria is a genus of lichen-forming fungi in the family Pannariaceae. The widespread genus contains an estimated 51 species, found primarily in tropical regions.

Species
Pannaria aenea 
Pannaria andina 
Pannaria aotearoana 
Pannaria asahinae 
Pannaria athroophylla 
Pannaria byssoidea 
Pannaria caesiocinerea 
Pannaria caespitosa 
Pannaria calophylla 
Pannaria centrifuga 
Pannaria cinerascens 
Pannaria complanata 
Pannaria conoplea 
Pannaria contorta 
Pannaria crenulata 
Pannaria crustata 
Pannaria decipiens 
Pannaria delicata 
Pannaria dissecta 
Pannaria durietzii 
Pannaria elatior 
Pannaria elegantior 
Pannaria elixii 
Pannaria emodii 
Pannaria euphylla 
Pannaria farinosa 
Pannaria fimbriata 
Pannaria flabellata 
Pannaria formosana 
Pannaria fulvescens 
Pannaria gallowayi 
Pannaria globigera 
Pannaria hookeri 
Pannaria howeana 
Pannaria immixta 
Pannaria implexa 
Pannaria insularis 
Pannaria isabellina 
Pannaria isidiosa 
Pannaria lanuginosa 
Pannaria leproloma 
Pannaria lobulifera 
Pannaria lurida 
Pannaria mangroviana 
Pannaria microphyllizans 
Pannaria minutiphylla 
Pannaria molkenboeri 
Pannaria multifida 
Pannaria nilgherriensis 
Pannaria obscura 
Pannaria oregonensis
Pannaria papuana 
Pannaria patagonica 
Pannaria phyllidiata 
Pannaria planiuscula 
Pannaria pruinosa 
Pannaria pulverulacea 
Pannaria pulvinula 
Pannaria ramosii 
Pannaria ramulosa 
Pannaria reflectens 
Pannaria rolfii 
Pannaria rubiginella 
Pannaria rubiginosa 
Pannaria squamulosa 
Pannaria streimannii 
Pannaria subcrustacea 
Pannaria subfusca 
Pannaria tavaresii 
Pannaria tenuis 
Pannaria tjibodensis

References

Peltigerales
Lichen genera
Peltigerales genera